Gaurena pretiosa is a moth in the family Drepanidae. It is found in China (Yunnan).

References

Moths described in 1966
Thyatirinae